Yogimath is situated in Nuapada district at a distance of about 9 km from Khariar western Odisha border area and 67 km from Bhawanipatna of Kalahandi District. This place is famous for its neolithic cave paintings. In Yogimath caves the paintings are drawn by red paint over rock surfaces. The most significant pictures are of a bull followed by cow, calf and a man indicating the domestication of animal by man and agriculture. The past glory of this place is still unexplored. Near Yogimath, there is a mountain named Risipiti which is well known for producing clear echoes.

History
On the basis of art style, colour composition of the motifs, the paintings can be dated to the Mesolithic-Chalcolithic periods. The paintings at Gudahandi of kalahandi may be placed about 15th millennium B.C., but those at yogimath are somewhat of later period and may be assigned to about 10th millennium B.C. The painting are largely disfigure by human vandalism and superimposition of ritualistic symbols like trident, swastika and other Hindu symbols in a paste of vermillion and ghee.
The rock art shelter exhibits both monochrome and bi-chrome paintings of early historic period. It is the only reported rock art site of Nuapada district. The shelter preserves paintings in monochrome of dark red. The subject matters are stick like human figure, cattle with or without hump, concentric circles, curvilinear, circles like shapes drawn one upon the other and dambaru (cattle drum) like shapes.

Study

The granite hillock Risipith preserves paintings of prehistoric times in an inclined surface of a boulder. The shelter was first reported by J.P Sing Deo in 1976. But first time  Dr. Subrat Kumar Prusty read the rock painting of the Yogimatha which was older script of India. The script ‘Ga’, and ‘o’ (tha) was discovered from yogimatha rock painting, this painting saw a person with four animals and write some alphabet. According to Dr. Prusty, that painting created a word Like "Gaitha" (very popular Odia word at present ‘Gotha’ or ‘group’ in English). This art closely related to this alphabet. This alphabet has similarity to Vikramkhol Inscription, Dhauli and Jaugada Inscription's script of Ashok. He assume it was the ancient form of Indian script named Pre-Brahmi Script and it is the first glimpse of possible origin of the Odia language and script.

References

Odisha
Caves containing pictograms in India
Rock shelters
Odia language
Rock art
Indian painting
Brahmic scripts